Pottersville is an unincorporated community split between Bedminster Township in Somerset County, Tewksbury Township in Hunterdon County and Washington Township in Morris County, New Jersey, United States. The area is served as United States Postal Service ZIP Code 07979. As of the 2010 United States Census, the population for ZIP Code Tabulation Area 07979 was 589. In 1990, most of the village was listed on the National Register of Historic Places as the Pottersville Village Historic District.

Demographics

Education
The Purnell School, a private all-girls boarding high school founded in 1963, was located in Pottersville. In February 2021, Purnell School announced that it would cease operations upon the completion of the 2020-2021 academic year. Later that year, Pingry School purchased the 82-acre campus to use as an extension of its existing campuses in Basking Ridge and Short Hills.

History
Pottersville was first called Lamington and afterwards Potters Mills. There were mills here as early as 1756 built and owned by William Willet. One Mill still stands on the left side of County Route 512 heading towards Califon. It was originally used for weaving woolen goods and later turned into a grist mill. The first grist mill was built along the Lamington River (Black River), but no longer stands. A commemorative plaque has taken its place.

William Willet owned a day book in which he recorded sales to the Continental Army during the Revolutionary War. His main consideration became supplying the Continental Army. He was paid in Continental currency which around 1780 became worthless. He was ruined financially and was forced to sell both mills to Serrin Potter in 1783, which led to the community's name.

In 1887 upwards of 200,000 baskets of peaches were shipped from Pottersville and New Germantown (Oldwick) by wagons to Chester, Whitehouse and other area communities. The profitable peach growing industry led the Rockaway Valley Railroad to build a spur to Pottersville in 1888.

Black River Falls in Pottersville prompted the railroad to run excursions to the falls. The land around the glen were made into picnic grounds and an amusement park. There was a merry-go-round, dance pavilion and refreshment stand. Some visitors came from Jersey City, N.J. and usually stayed at the Pottersville Hotel.  Failure of the peach crop eventually resulted in the end of the Rockaway Railroad. One town resident remembers the park open as late as 1920.

Historic district

The Pottersville Village Historic District is a historic district encompassing the village. The district was added to the National Register of Historic Places on September 18, 1990 for its significance in industry, commerce, architecture, settlement, and archeology from 1750 to 1924. It includes 44 contributing buildings, 4 contributing sites and 2 contributing structures.

Gallery

Notable people
People who were born in, residents of, or otherwise closely associated with Pottersville include:
 Harriet Adams (1893–1982), author of some 200 books, including nearly 50 in the Nancy Drew series.

See also
National Register of Historic Places listings in Hunterdon County, New Jersey
National Register of Historic Places listings in Morris County, New Jersey
National Register of Historic Places listings in Somerset County, New Jersey

References

External links
 
 

Bedminster, New Jersey
Tewksbury Township, New Jersey
Washington Township, Morris County, New Jersey
Unincorporated communities in Hunterdon County, New Jersey
Unincorporated communities in Morris County, New Jersey
Unincorporated communities in Somerset County, New Jersey
Unincorporated communities in New Jersey
National Register of Historic Places in Hunterdon County, New Jersey
National Register of Historic Places in Morris County, New Jersey
National Register of Historic Places in Somerset County, New Jersey
New Jersey Register of Historic Places
Historic districts on the National Register of Historic Places in New Jersey